Jasso may refer to:

People
 Antonio Jasso (1935–2013), Mexican footballer
 Aracely Escalante Jasso, (born 1943), Mexican politician
 Guillermina Jasso, American sociologist
 José Jasso (1911–1968), a Mexican character actor
 María Leticia Jasso (born 1948), Mexican politician
 Ralph Jasso, former member of the band The Mars Volta
 Steve Jasso (born 2000), American soccer player

Other uses
 Jasso, Hidalgo a town in Hidalgo, Mexico; see Cruz Azul Hidalgo
 A vernacular name for Payazzo (or pajatso), the traditional Finnish gambling arcade game
 An abbreviation for Japan Students Services Organization; see Japan and East Asia Studies Program

See also
Jasso-kissa (Jasso the cat), the Finnish comic book character by Jii Roikonen